Russia participated at the 2010 Summer Youth Olympics in Singapore. The Russian team consisted of 96 athletes competing in 20 sports: aquatics (swimming), archery, athletics, basketball, boxing, canoeing, fencing, gymnastics, handball, judo, modern pentathlon, rowing, sailing, shooting, table tennis, taekwondo, tennis, volleyball, weightlifting and wrestling. Viktoria Komova won most medals, with 3 gold medals and 1 bronze medal.

Medalists
Medals awarded to participants of mixed-NOC teams are represented in italics. These medals are not counted towards the individual NOC medal tally.

|width="30%" align=left valign=top|

Archery

Boys

Girls

Mixed

Athletics

Boys
Track and Road Events

Field Events

Girls
Track and Road Events

Field Events

Basketball

Girls

Boxing 

Boys

Canoeing

Boys

Girls

Fencing

Group Stage

Knock-Out Stage

Gymnastics

Artistic Gymnastics

Boys

Girls

Rhythmic Gymnastics 

Individual

Team

Handball

Judo

Individual

Team

Modern pentathlon

Rowing

Sailing

Windsurfing

Shooting

Pistol

Rifle

Swimming

Boys

Girls

Mixed

 * raced in heats only

Table tennis

Individual

Team

Taekwondo

Tennis

Singles

Doubles

Volleyball

Weightlifting

Wrestling

Freestyle

Greco-Roman

References

External links

Competitors List: Russia

2010 in Russian sport
Nations at the 2010 Summer Youth Olympics
Russia at the Youth Olympics